Tannaz Irani (née Lal) is an Indian actress. She has acted in Bollywood films and Hindi television serials. She has also been credited as Tannaz Lal, her maiden name, and Tannaz Currim (during her first marriage).

Career 
Tannaz began her film career in 2000, with her debut as Neeta in Kaho Naa... Pyaar Hai, directed by Rakesh Roshan. That film was also the debut film of the lead actors Hrithik Roshan and Ameesha Patel. She played Patel's cousin and Roshan's friend. Her significant credits include Abbas Mustan's thriller 36 China Town, Sooraj Barjatya's Main Prem Ki Diwani Hoon, and Jugal Hansraj's Roadside Romeo. She has also acted in several television serials including Ye Meri Life Hai, Kis Desh Mein Hai Meraa Dil, and played the role of Lisa D'Souza on the sitcom Badi Door Se Aaye Hain. In 2019, played Nishi Sippy on the TV show Kahaan Hum Kahaan Tum.

Besides acting, Tannaz was also the Runner-up of Mrs. India 2002. She and her husband, Bakhtiyaar Irani, came in third in the celebrity dance show Nach Baliye in 2006. They have also done a music album that was choreographed by Bosco-Caesar. In 2009, she featured as a housemate on the reality show Bigg Boss 3; and participated in Maa Exchange in 2011, with Vindu Dara Singh's wife Dina.

Personal life 

An Irani Zoroastrian by birth, Tanaaz was very young when she married Farid Currim. She was 20 when she gave birth to her first daughter Zianne, who stays with her ex-husband Farid Currim. After her divorce, she started acting in serials. In 2006, she met actor Bakhtiyaar Irani, on the set of Fame Gurukul. The duo fell in love and wanted to get married, but it was not permitted by Bakhtiyaar's family because Tannaz is seven years older than Bakhtiyaar. However, Delnaaz and his elder brother, Paurus Irani, helped to convince their parents, and the couple got married in 2007. On 20 March 2008, the couple's first child, a boy, was born. They named him Zeus after the Greek God. On 19 September 2011, Tannaz gave birth to a second girl, Zara Irani.

Filmography

Films

Television

Web series

See also 

List of Indian film actresses

References

External links 

 

Living people
Year of birth missing (living people)
Actresses from Mumbai
Actresses in Hindi cinema
Indian film actresses
Indian television actresses
21st-century Indian actresses
Bigg Boss (Hindi TV series) contestants
Irani people